The 1982 Eastern Illinois Panthers football team represented Eastern Illinois University as a member of the Association of Mid-Continent Universities during the 1982 NCAA Division I-AA football season.

Schedule

Roster

References 

Eastern Illinois
Eastern Illinois Panthers football seasons
Eastern Illinois Panthers football
Association of Mid-Continent Universities football champion seasons